Warcop is a civil parish in the Eden District, Cumbria, England. It contains 28 listed buildings that are recorded in the National Heritage List for England. Of these, one is listed at Grade I, the highest of the three grades, two are at Grade II*, the middle grade, and the others are at Grade II, the lowest grade.  The parish contains the villages of Warcop and Sandford, and is otherwise rural.  All the listed buildings are in the villages, apart from a milestone on the A66 road.  Most of the listed buildings are houses and associated structures, and farmhouses and farm buildings.  The other listed buildings consist of a church, a churchyard cross, a maypole, a public house, and a bridge.


Key

Buildings

Notes and references

Notes

Citations

Sources

Lists of listed buildings in Cumbria